Frank Day may refer to:

 Frank A. Day (1855–1928), Minnesota legislator
 Frank Day (artist) (1902–1976), Native American artist
 Frank Miles Day (1861–1918), Philadelphia-based architect
 Frank Parker Day (1881–1950), Canadian athlete, academic and author
 Frank R. Day (1853–1899), entrepreneur and politician in Los Angeles and Monterey, California